Mătăsari is a commune in Gorj County, Oltenia, Romania. It is composed of five villages: Brădet, Brădețel, Croici, Mătăsari and Runcurel.

References

Communes in Gorj County
Localities in Oltenia